Robert James "Bobby" Lincoln (born 8 September 1953) is a South African professional golfer who was a regular winner on the Southern African Tour from 1985 to 2000, and now plays on the European Seniors Tour.

Lincoln played on the European Tour in the late 1970s and early 1980s with little success. He was over thirty before he found success on his home tour by winning the 1985 Wild Coast Pro-Am. He went on to win three times in each of the following three years.  He served on the Southern Africa Tour Players Committee from 1991 to 2006

Lincoln joined the European Seniors Tour in 2006, and claimed his first senior win in 2007 at the Jersey Seniors Classic.

Professional wins (19)

Sunshine Tour wins (15)
1985 Wild Coast Pro-Am
1986 Wild Coast Pro-Am, Bethlehem Classic
1987 Protea Assurance Challenge, Wild Coast Pro-Am, Bethlehem Classic
1988 AECI Charity Classic, Bethlehem Classic, Ronnie Bass Pro-Am
1989 Zululand Classic
1992 Amatola Sun Classic, Trustbank Tournament of Champions
1998 Platinum Classic
1999 Bearing Man Highveld Classic, Platinum Classic

Other wins (3)
1986 Johnnie Walker Air Mauritius Golf Classic
2006 Nelson Mandela Invitational (with Retief Goosen)
2008 Gary Player Invitational (with Garth Mulroy)

European Senior Tour wins (1)

Results in major championships

Note: Lincoln only played in The Open Championship.
CUT = missed the half-way cut

External links

South African male golfers
Sunshine Tour golfers
European Tour golfers
European Senior Tour golfers
1953 births
Living people
20th-century South African people